Sam Mitchell may refer to:

 Sam Mitchell (basketball) (born 1963), former American basketball player, head coach, and analyst
 Sam Mitchell (footballer) (born 1982), Australian rules player
 Sam Mitchell (EastEnders), fictional character in the TV series EastEnders

See also
 Samuel Mitchell (disambiguation)